Caleb Carr was the representative of Otsego County, New York State in 60th New York State Legislature.

References

Year of birth missing
Year of death missing
People from Otsego County, New York
Members of the New York State Assembly